Unthinkable is a 2010 American film.

Unthinkable may also refer to:

The Unthinkable (1926 film), a Polish film
The Unthinkable (2018 film), a Swedish film
The Unthinkable (2021 film), a Swazi film
"Unthinkable (Arrow)", season 2 episode of Arrow
"Un-Thinkable (I'm Ready)", Alicia Keys song
"Unthinkable", song from Allfrumtha I (album) by Allfrumtha I

See also 
Operation Unthinkable, British plan to attack the Soviet Union in 1945